Erich Stumpf (22 May 1927 – 1972) was an Austrian footballer, who was affiliated with Sturm Graz. He competed in the men's tournament at the 1952 Summer Olympics.

References

External links
 
 

1927 births
1972 deaths
Austrian footballers
Austria international footballers
Olympic footballers of Austria
Footballers at the 1952 Summer Olympics
Place of birth missing
Association football forwards
SK Sturm Graz players